Field hockey at the 2016 Summer Olympics in Rio de Janeiro took place from 6 to 19 August at the Olympic Hockey Centre in Deodoro. The competition had instituted several changes in the format and structure from the 2012 Summer Olympics. Twenty-four teams (twelve each for men and women) competed in the tournament.

Competition schedule
The match schedule of the men's tournament was unveiled on 27 April 2016.

Format changes
On 20 March 2014, the International Hockey Federation (FIH) instituted the changes to the match format, reducing from two 35-minute halves to four 15-minute quarters, with 2 minutes' rest after each period, and 15 at halftime. The purpose of the changes aims to improve the flow and intensity of the competition, and reinforce fan experience and opportunity for game presentation and analysis. Other changes include the implementation of 40-second time outs following both penalty corner awards and the scoring of a goal. Both interruptions and time outs must assure that the 60-minute game time is escalated for actual tournament and not depleted with a penalty corner set up, especially when the ball is not in play. Games ending in ties in knockout rounds are decided by penalty shootouts, as overtime was abolished in 2013.

According to Leandro Negre, president of FIH, “The decision today demonstrates our commitment to fan engagement. With the additional breaks, fans will have the opportunity to enjoy more replays and be more engaged with the event, whether in the stadium or watching from afar, while hockey commentators will be allowed more time to provide sport analysis between plays. In addition, coaches and players will see improvement in their performance with the additional opportunities to re-hydrate and re-strategize.”

Qualification

Men's qualification

Each of the Continental Champions from five confederations received an automatic berth. Brazil, as the host nation, qualified automatically but with a rider: due to the relatively low standard of field hockey in Brazil, the International Hockey Federation (FIH) and the International Olympic Committee (IOC) required Brazil to place higher than thirtieth in the FIH World Rankings by the end of 2014 or finish no worse than sixth at the 2015 Pan American Games in order to qualify as host nation. They achieved this by beating the United States on a penalty shoot-out in their quarterfinal, thus ensuring a top four finish. 

In addition, the six highest placed teams at the Semifinals of the 2014–15 FIH Hockey World League not already qualified received the remaining berths in this tournament.

Women's qualification

Each of the continental champions from five confederations received an automatic berth. The host nation did not qualify as they failed to place higher than fortieth in the FIH World Rankings by the end of 2014 nor finished or seventh at the 2015 Pan American Games, failing to  even qualify for that tournament: this restriction was decided between the International Hockey Federation (FIH) and the International Olympic Committee (IOC) due to the relatively low standard of field hockey in Brazil. In addition, the seven highest placed teams at the Semifinals of the 2014–15 FIH Hockey World League not already qualified received the remaining berths in this tournament.

Men's competition

The competition consisted of two stages; a group stage followed by a knockout stage.

Group stage
Teams were divided into two groups of six nations, playing every team in their group once. Three points were awarded for a victory, one for a draw. The top four teams per group qualified for the quarter-finals.

Group A

Group B

Knockout stage

Women's competition

The competition consisted of two stages; a group stage followed by a knockout stage.

Group stage
Teams were divided into two groups of six nations, playing every team in their group once. Three points were awarded for a victory, one for a draw. The top four teams per group qualified for the quarter-finals.

Group A

Group B

Knockout stage

Medal summary

Medal table

Medalists

References

External links

 
 
 
 Results Book – Hockey

 
Field hockey at the Summer Olympics
2016 Summer Olympics events
Summer Olympics
2016 Summer Olympics